Amjad, is a male name used as first and surname in Asia, Middle East and Latin America.

It may refer to:
Amjad Khan, a renowned Pakistani professional squash player.
Amjad Khan (1940-1992), Indian actor
Amjad Khan (cricketer, born 1966), former American cricketer
Amjad Khan (cricketer, born 1980), Danish born English cricketer.
Amjad Ali Khan (born 1945), Indian sarod player
Amjad Mohammed Khan (born 1970), anesthesiologist
Amjad Farooqi (1972-2004), Pakistani Islamic militant 
Amjad Hussain (born 1959), British Rear-admiral
Syed Amjad Ali (1907–1997), Pakistani civil servant
Mohammed Amjad (born 1971), former English cricketer
Amjad Iqbal (born 1983), Pakistani footballer
Amjad Parvez (born 1945), Pakistani ingenieur, writer and singer
Amjad Jaimoukha (Writer/Publicist, Jordan, 1964)
Amjad Islam Amjad (1944 - 2023), Pakistani poet and  screenwriter
Amjad Sabri (1976 - 2016), Pakistani qawwali singer
 Amjad Malik, character in the film Citizen Khan

References

Arabic masculine given names